Aglaia multinervis is a species of plant in the family Meliaceae. It is found in Indonesia, Malaysia, and Singapore.

References

multinervis
Near threatened plants
Taxonomy articles created by Polbot